Concordia Merrel  (born Mary Phyllis Joan Logan; 10 September 1885 – 18 May 1962) was a British stage and silent film actress, photographer's model and a prolific author of romantic fiction.

Biography
She was born as  Mary Phyllis Joan Logan in 1885 at Visakhapatnam, Andhra Pradesh in India, one of four children of Thomas Tweddle Logan (1855–1936), in 1880 the Principal of Bellary College in Madras and an Inspector of Schools in the Indian Educational Service, and Beatrice Maude née Pattenden (1860–1938). In 1891 Beatrice Logan was suffering ill-health and returned to England with her children while her husband remained in India. Her parents divorced in 1899 following her mother's adultery.

She married the actor Franklin Dyall in 1907 and with him had a son, the actor Valentine Dyall (1908-1985), who went on to find fame as radio's 'The Man in Black'. She left Dyall in 1929 so he could marry the actress Mary Merrall. She began a relationship with the actor and photographer Cavendish Morton and married in 1935, giving birth to the twins Cavendish Morton and Concord Morton in 1911. After a period of nomadic wandering the family settled in Bembridge in the Isle of Wight where the couple home-schooled their sons with an emphasis on the arts.

In her youth, she was a photographer's model and in 1910 was the 'Kodak Girl' on a poster in a well-known advertising campaign for that company based on a photograph taken by Morton.  In 1913 she played Mrs. Leighton in The Cormorant opposite her partner Cavendish Morton, and Giulia Verlaine in Greater Love Than This! at the Little Theatre in London. Her films roles included Pauline in A Smart Set (1919), Joan in The Lost Chord (1917), Margaret in Ave Maria (1918) and Mrs. Fleeter in My Sweetheart (1918).

Concordia Merrel and Cavendish Morton remained married until his death in 1939. She began writing romantic fiction in the 1920s, publishing her last novel in 1956. Her works were translated into four languages, with the last reprint occurring in 1999.

Concordia Merrel died in May 1962 in Eye, Suffolk in England. In her will, she left £739 6s to her sons Concord and Cavendish Morton.

Select publications
John Gresham's Girl, London : Hodder & Stoughton, [1926]
Love's Hazard, London : Hodder & Stoughton, [1934]
The Savage, London : Hodder & Stoughton, [1931]
Two Men and Sally, London : Hodder & Stoughton, [1926]
The Man without Mercy, London : Hodder & Stoughton, [1929]
Julia takes her chance, London : Selwyn & Blount, [1920]
The Miracle Merchant, London : Hodder & Stoughton, [1928]
Sally among the Stars, London : Hodder & Stoughton, [1930]
The Unconquerable Girl, London : Hodder & Stoughton, [1927]
The Surprising Marriage, London : Hodder & Stoughton, (1932)
The Fanshawe Family, London : Hodder & Stoughton, [1925]
The Cads' Party, London : Hodder & Stoughton, [1931]
The House of Yesterday, London : Hodder & Stoughton, [1932]
Jacqueline and Love, London : Hodder & Stoughton, [1925]
Love in Fetters, London : Hodder & Stoughton, [1925]
The Shadow of Red Mason, London : Hodder & Stoughton, [1930)
The Marriage of Anne, London : Hodder & Stoughton, [1927]
Adam - and some Eves, London : Hodder & Stoughton, [1931]
Introducing Terry Sloane, London : Hodder & Stoughton, [1933]
His Lucky Star, London : Hodder & Stoughton, [1929] 
Heart's Journey, London : Hodder & Stoughton, [1924]
The Girl with No Name, London : Hodder & Stoughton, [1925]
Love Courageous, London : Selwyn & Blount, [1922]
Storm Comes to Stay, London : Hodder & Stoughton, [1935]
Love-and Diana, London : Hodder & Stoughton, [1926]
Married for Money, London : Hodder & Stoughton, [1925]
Ragged Robin, London : Hodder & Stoughton, [1925)
The Seventh Miss Brown, London : Hodder & Stoughton, [1927]
Consequences, London : Hodder & Stoughton, [1931]
Ordeal by Marriage, London : Hodder & Stoughton, [1925]
Les Deux fiancés de Lisbeth, [S.l.] : [s.n.], [1937] 
C'est toi que je cherchais - The Seventh Miss Brown, Adapté de l'anglais par Th. & E. de Saint-Segond, Paris; Édimbourg printed 1939
In Pursuit of Happiness, [1956]

References

External links

1885 births
1962 deaths
Actresses from Visakhapatnam
English silent film actresses
English artists' models
English romantic fiction writers
20th-century English novelists
20th-century English women writers
English women novelists
Women romantic fiction writers
20th-century English actresses
English film actresses
English stage actresses